The Federazione Italiana Hockey, also known as the Italian Hockey Federation, is the governing body for field and indoor hockey in Italy. It was founded in 1922 and is a member of the International Hockey Federation (FIH) and the European Hockey Federation (EHF).

The federation is responsible for organizing and promoting field and indoor hockey at all levels in Italy, from grassroots to elite level. It oversees the national teams, both men's and women's, and organizes national competitions for clubs and schools.

The Italian Hockey Federation has been successful in recent years, with the men's team qualifying for the Olympic Games in Rio de Janeiro in 2016 and the women's team finishing third in the EuroHockey Championship II in 2017. The federation also supports the development of hockey in Italy, with programs aimed at increasing participation and providing coaching and education opportunities for players, coaches, and officials.

References

Hockey in Italy